Urraco is Spanish for Magpie. It may refer to:
Ibis GS-501 Urraco, a Colombian aircraft design
Lamborghini Urraco, an Italian car design
Licania platypus, a tree native to Central America also known as the urraco.